Cal McGowan (born June 19, 1970) is an American former professional ice hockey player.

McGowan played junior hockey with the Kamloops Blazers in the Western Hockey League and with the Delta Flyers and Merritt Centennials of the British Columbia Hockey League, then went on to play eight seasons in the minor leagues before retiring as a professional player.

Career statistics

Awards
 WHL West First All-Star Team – 1991

References

1970 births
Amarillo Rattlers players
American men's ice hockey centers
Binghamton Rangers players
Florida Everblades players
Ice hockey people from Nebraska
Kalamazoo Wings (1974–2000) players
Kamloops Blazers players
Living people
Merritt Centennials players
Minnesota North Stars draft picks
Rote Teufel Bad Nauheim players
People from Sidney, Nebraska
Worcester IceCats players